The 2020 Mackay Cutters season was the 13th in the club's history. Coached by Michael Crawley and captained by Jayden Hodges, they competed in the QRL's Intrust Super Cup. The Cutters played just one game in 2020 after the season was cancelled due to the COVID-19 pandemic.

Season summary
Mackay entered 2020 with a new head coach, former long-time NRL assistant Michael Crawley, and a hosts of new recruits, including former NRL player and Tongan international Mafoa'aeata Hingano. The Cutters lost their opening game of the season, 23–22 to the Norths Devils.

On 17 March, two days after the completion of Round One, the Queensland Rugby League (QRL) announced a 10-week suspension of the competition until 5 June, due to the COVID-19 pandemic. On 27 March, ten days after the suspension, the QRL confirmed the cancellation of the competition for the 2020 season.

Squad List

2020 squad

Squad movement

Gains

Losses

Fixtures

Regular season

Statistics

References

2020 in Australian rugby league
2020 in rugby league by club
Mackay Cutters